Bagh Bid-e Olya (also Romanized as Bāgh Bīd-e ‘Olyā; also known as Bāb Bīd-e ‘Olyā (Persian: باب بيدعليا), Bāb Bīd-e Bālā and Bābīd-e ‘Olyā) is a village in Javaran Rural District, Hanza District, Rabor County, Kerman Province, Iran. At the 2006 census, its population was 146, in 37 families.

References 

Populated places in Rabor County